Botswana competed  at the 1998 Commonwealth Games, sending 24 athletes in five sports, including their first participation in squash.

Results by event

Athletics
Lulu Basinyi 	
Justice Dipeba 	
Glody Dube 	
Kabo Gabaseme
Gable Garenamotse 	
Johnson Kubisa 	
Dithapelo Molefi
Tsoseletso Nkala

Badminton
Emmanuel Kebairejang
Mmoloki Mothala
Harold Ndaba
Kabelo Ofentse
Tebogo Ofentse

Bowls
Flora Anderson
Clifton Richardson

Boxing
Men's Flyweight (– 51 kg)
Elliot Mmila

Men's Featherweight (– 57 kg)
Gilbert Khunwane 	

Men's Lightweight (– 60 kg)
Bikkie Malaolo

Men's Welterweight (– 67 kg)
Thebe Setlalekgosi

Squash
Cunning Machinya
Meleko Mokgosi 	
Conrad Ntshebe
Lefika Ragontse
Pula Tangane

See also
Botswana at the 1996 Summer Olympics
Botswana at the 2000 Summer Olympics

References
 Official results by country

Botswana at the Commonwealth Games
Nations at the 1998 Commonwealth Games
Commonwealth Games